Klaudija Bubalo (née Klikovac; born 17 March 1970) is a retired Croatian handball player, who played for the clubs RK Lokomotiva Zagreb and Metz Handball.

While playing for Kraš Zagreb, her club reached the final in the 1997–98 EHF Women's Cup Winners' Cup.

She represented Croatia at the 1997 World Women's Handball Championship, when Croatia placed 6th.

References

External links

1970 births
Living people
Croatian female handball players
Expatriate handball players
Croatian expatriate sportspeople in France